Melaka United Football Club was a Malaysian professional football club based in Malacca that competed in the Malaysia Super League. They were owned by Kenteam Sdn Bhd, which is one of main nitrile glove producers in Malaysia. The club's home ground has been the Hang Tuah Stadium, before moving to Hang Jebat Stadium in Paya Rumput, Krubong in 1924. The club represented the state of Malacca in Malaysian football competitions. They reached the top division in Malaysian football after back-to-back promotions as champion of the 2015 Malaysia FAM League and 2016 Malaysia Premier League.

The club was formerly referred to as Malacca or officially as Malacca Amateur FA and Malacca FA. Malacca FA biggest achievement in Malaysia football was becoming the Malaysian League champion in 1983, led by Asian Football Hall of Fame, Soh Chin Ann.

The club's nickname was Hang Tuah, the name being synonymous with strength and intelligence.

Melaka United's regular kit colours were green and white for shirts, shorts and socks.

History

Origins
Malacca has sent a football team to play in Malaya Cup since its inaugural season in 1921. In 1924, the team has been registered and now managed by the newly formed governance body of Malacca football, the Malacca Amateur Football Association (MAFA). Since then, the football team has been competing in Malaya Cup and FAM Cup consistently. MAFA biggest achievement when they reached the final 1957 and 1958 FAM Cup led by Robert Choe.

The era of amateur football league

In 1979, the Football Association of Malaysia (FAM) changed the format of Piala Malaysia when they introduced the league stage that acts as the qualifying round for the knockout stage of Piala Malaysia. It was intended primarily as a qualifying tournament for the final knock-out stages of the Piala Malaysia where teams compete in a one-round league before advanced to the knock-out stage.

The football league in Malaysia has only officially started in 1982, after the introduction of league winners trophy. The league has been known as Liga Malaysia. Malacca football team continued to compete in the league and has become the champion of the league during its second season in 1983? which has been the only time the Malacca team become a champion of the top-tier league in Malaysian football.

The era of semi-pro football league

Over the years, the league competition has gained important stature in its own right. From 1982 until 1988 the league has an amateur status and continues its purpose as qualifying round for Piala Malaysia. Only in 1989 it is changed to a new format as Liga Semi-Pro (MSPFL), introduced by FAM as a way towards fully professional status. The inaugural season of MSPFL consisted of nine teams in Division I and eight teams in Division II. Malacca has been put in Division II from 1989 to 1992 seasons.

Era of professional football

MSPFL was the nation's top-tier league until it was succeeded by the Liga Perdana (1994–97). In its inaugural season, 16 teams competed. The teams were based from all states in Malaysia including Malacca, Kuala Lumpur and addition of two teams from Singapore and Brunei.

In 1998, Liga Perdana was divided into two divisions consist of Liga Perdana 1 and Liga Perdana 2. During 1998, Liga Perdana 1 consist of 12 teams while Liga Perdana 2 had 8 teams. Malacca competed in Liga Perdana 2 from 1998 until 2000, before achieving promotion to Liga Perdana 1 for 2001 season.

At this time the league still consisted of semi-pro team where each team was allowed to register 25 players (minimum of 12 professionals for Liga Perdana 1 and 6 professional for Liga Perdana 2).

Malacca competed in Liga Perdana 1 from 2001 until 2003. Football Association of Malaysia (FAM) decided to privatise the league for 2004 season onwards, when the Liga Super was formed.

Teams in Liga Perdana 1 and Liga Perdana 2 were put through a qualification and playoffs to be promoted into the Liga Super. Malacca failed to qualify and was put into a new second-tier Liga Premier for the 2004 season.

Playing in Malaysia Premier League
The club has been in an up and down performance in Malaysia Premier League since the league inception. They played for three seasons and were promoted to the top-tier Malaysia Super League.

Brief year in Malaysia Super League
After a successful season in second division, the club has been promoted to the top-tier division, the Liga Super for 2006-07 season. The club has splurged a big budget to buy players while removing majority of squsd from the previous winning season, in order to create a more competitive team.

Back to second division
A slump in performance has caused the club struggling and fighting for relegation in their three seasons of Malaysia Premier League, from 2008 until 2010, before the dark era. The club has been relegated to the Malaysia FAM League for 2011 season.

Years of struggle in Malaysia FAM League
The club has been relegated from 2010 Malaysia Premier League to the Malaysia FAM League, despite being one of the bigger clubs within it. The club continued to compete and had been a consistent team in third-tier league for five straight seasons.

A comeback from lower league 
The club made a comeback to second-tier league, Malaysia Premier League, in 2016 after being promoted as champions of 2015 Malaysia FAM League. Before winning the FAM League, the club had experienced a 32-year trophy drought, where the last time Melaka United won the Malaysian top-tier league was in 1983. It was the league stage that served as the qualifying round for the Malaysian Cup. During that time, national footballer Soh Chin Ann was playing for Malacca

The club has achieved promotion to Liga Super after becaming the champion of the Malaysia Premier League just one year after winning the Malaysia FAM League.

Back to top division league
After the promotion to the top division, Melaka United management has made a number of changes, including the new squad selection. On 14 November 2016, Melaka United has announced the appointment of Eric Williams to replace Mat Zan Mat Aris as the new head coach for the club. Eric Williams has previously managed the Myanmar Yangon United F.C. in the 2014 season. The club has also only retained ten players from previous season and has recruited nine new players.

The club has set a high target for 2017 season, including to reach the top five in the league standings. On 18 February 2017, the club has managed to win their first match in Liga Super, almost 10 years after their last win in the top division in 2006–07 season.

Dissolution
Melaka United announced the decision to dissolve the club in 2022, after failing to pay the players and coaches. The debt was thought to be more than RM 3 million. Melaka F.C. become a new team to represent the state of Malacca for 2023 onwards, though they will not inherit the honours and titles won by Melaka United.

Stadium

Melaka United last played at Hang Jebat Stadium. The capacity of the stadium is 40,000. In addition to the football field, the stadium also consists of a running track.

The club has previously been using the Hang Tuah Stadium as their home ground.It was still used as a training ground and home stadium for development and youth squad, which mostly competed in Piala Presiden and Piala Belia.

Crest and colours

Crest
Melaka United has historically utilised one primary crest before the introduction of football league in Malaysia. The first, adopted when the club was founded, was the image of A Famosa, historical remains from the colonial age in Malacca. It was used during the club's amateur era and remained for more than half-century.

Since the introduction of football league, the club has evolved from amateur years and has adopted a new crest which featured an image of Malacca tree, which the city was named after.

Since the end of 2013, the club has had a rebranding to Melaka United, where a new version crest was introduced.

Colours
Melaka United have always worn green and white shirts as their home kit as it was an iconic colour for the club.

Melaka United's away colours were usually all white with green trim, or various combinations of blue, red, yellow and white, as it represents the colour of Malacca's flag.

Colours and kit evolution
Home

Away

Supporters
Ultras Taming Sari (UTS) was mainly known for supporting Melaka United. The group was one of many ultras supporters created under the branches of Ultras Malaya.

Melaka United was one of the most supported clubs in Malacca. Melaka United's traditional fanbase come from all over the Central Malacca District, Alor Gajah and Jasin area.

Ownership and finances
The Malacca football team has been founded since 1921, and the management of the club has been taken over by the foundation of Malacca Amateur Football Association in 1924. The club has been thriving with the financial backing from the state government and sponsors.

In 2014 the management went through a restructuring process to become the Melaka United Soccer Association

Sponsorship

Players

First-team squad

Development squad

Under-21s

Under-19s

Head coaches

Records

Team managers

Technical staff
''

Honours

Domestic competitions

League
 Liga Malaysia / Liga Semi-Pro Divisyen 1 / Liga Perdana / Liga Perdana 1 / Liga Super
  Winners (1): 1983

 Liga Semi-Pro Divisyen 2 / Liga Perdana 2 / Liga Premier
  Winners (1): 2016
  Runners-up (2): 2000, 2005–06

 Piala FAM / Liga FAM
  Winners (1): 2015
  Runners-up (2): 1957, 1958

Cups
Piala FA
 Winners: -

Piala Malaysia
 Winners: -

Piala Sumbangsih
 Winners: -

Preseason  competitions
Malacca TYT Cup
 Winners (1): 2022

Performance in AFC competitions
 Asian Club Championship / AFC Champions League: 1 appearance
1986: Southeast Asia Qualifying/ASEAN Champions Cup–4th place

Club record
Pld = Played, W = Won, D = Drawn, L = Lost, F = Goals for, A = Goals against, D = Goal difference, Pts= Points, Pos = Position

Source:

Individual player awards

Malaysian League Golden boot winners

Malaysian League top goalscorers

Notable former players
This list of prominent former players includes those who received international caps while playing for the team, made significant contribution in terms of appearances or goals, or to the sport either before they played for the team, or after they left. It is not complete or all inclusive, additions and refinements will continue to be made over time.

 Ilija Spasojević
 Soh Chin Ann
 Safiq Rahim
 Lim Teong Kim
 Azizan Baba
 Shukor Adan
 V. Murugan
 Nurshamil Abd Ghani
 Ong Kim Swee
 Amri Yahyah
 Marko Šimić

Affiliated clubs
 Melaka
 SAMB

References

External links
 Melaka United at Football Malaysia

 
Malaysia Super League clubs
Football clubs in Malaysia
1924 establishments in British Malaya
Sport in Malacca